Sergey Alexandrovich Tereshchenko (30 March 1951 – 10 February 2023) was a Kazakh politician. He served as Prime Minister of Kazakhstan from 16 December 1991 to 12 October 1994.

Life and career
Tereshchenko was born in the town of Lesozavodsk, which was in the Primorsky Krai Region of the RSFSR. He moved to Kazakhstan in 1969 where he studied mechanical engineering at the Kazakh National Agrarian University, where he graduated in 1973. After graduation, he was sent to work as chief engineer of the collective farm in Shymkent (known at the time as Chimkent). In 1975, he was elected First Secretary of the Tulkubas District Komsomol Committee, where he worked for four years. In the seven years after he left that post, he served as the head local party/executive positions in Shymkent. 

In the Spring of 1990, he worked as a deputy to the Chairman of the Supreme Soviet of the Kazakh SSR. For about one and a half years after leaving that post, he was the First Secretary of the Shymkent Communist Party Central Committee. He served as Vice-President of the Kazakh SSR. In the remaining months of 1991, Tereshchenko assumed the post of Prime Minister of the Kazakh SSR. When the country gained independence on 16 December, he was appointed to the newly created post of Prime Minister. During his tenure, his government began work to privatize formerly state-run companies. He also proposed strengthening executive power in order to bring about economic reforms in the country.

In late May 1994, he suffered a defeat when the Parliament of Kazakhstan passed a vote of no confidence in the Tereshchenko Government. He held out for several months until he was dismissed by President Nursultan Nazarbayev on 12 October following a corruption scandal involving his Minister of Internal Affairs that month. Akezhan Kazhegeldin was chosen to be Tereshchenko's successor, which followed his retirement from public service. After his dismissal, he served as the President of the International Foundation "Integration", the main goal of which is the start of a geointegration process of Kazakhstan into the economic, political, and cultural space of the modern world. In 1998, he was among those supporting the re-election of Nursultan Nazarbayev for the presidency.

Personal life and death
Tereshchenko was an ethnic Ukrainian and was one of the first from his ethnicity to take office in independent Kazakhstan. His wife, Yevgenia Grigorievna, was a Russian language teacher of literature. They had two daughters, Nina and Elena.

Tereshchenko died in 10 February 2023, at the age of 71.

Awards
 Hero of Labor (2012) 
 Order of Otan (2012)
 Presidential Peace and Spiritual Consent Award (1999)
 Order of Friendship 1st Degree (1999)
 Order of Barys 2nd Degree (2005) 
 Order of Friendship (2004) (Russian Federation)
 Order "Alғys" (2012) (Russian Orthodox Church, Metropolitan Church of Kazakhstan)
 Honorary Citizen of the South Kazakhstan Region
 Freedom of the city of Almaty (2014)
Honorary Citizen of the City of Almaty
 Presidential Prize for Peace and Spiritual Consent of the Republic of Kazakhstan (1999)

External links
История в лицах – Сергей Терещенко

References

External links

1951 births
2023 deaths
Kazakhstani people of Ukrainian descent
Prime Ministers of Kazakhstan
Vice presidents of Kazakhstan
Communist Party of the Soviet Union members
Heads of government of the Kazakh Soviet Socialist Republic
Central Committee of the Communist Party of the Soviet Union members
People from Lesozavodsk
Sergey